Scammon, also spelled Scamman, is a surname. Notable people with the surname include:
Charles Melville Scammon (1825–1911), American whaleman, naturalist, and author.
Doug Scamman, American farmer and politician
Eliakim P. Scammon (1816–1894), American Civil War brigadier general
J. Young Scammon (1812–1890), American politician, lawyer, banker, and newspaper publisher 
John Fairfield Scamman (1786–1858), American politician
John Scammon (1865–1940), American politician and lawyer
Richard M. Scammon (1915–2001), American author, political scientist and elections scholar
Seth Scamman (1811–1894), American farmer, educator and politician
Stella Scamman, American farmer, teacher and politician